Lisa Hansen (born July 8, 1954) is an American rower. She competed in the women's quadruple sculls event at the 1976 Summer Olympics.

References

External links
 

1954 births
Living people
American female rowers
Olympic rowers of the United States
Rowers at the 1976 Summer Olympics
Sportspeople from Oakland, California
21st-century American women